Central Parade, on the corner of Hoe Street and Church Hill, Walthamstow, is a shopping parade with offices and flats above that is Grade II listed by Historic England. It was designed in 1954 by F. G. Southgate, the borough surveyor, and built in 1957–58. Historic England says that it "embodies the Festival [of Britain] style, blending pattern and colour, surface decoration, slender detailing and lively rhythmical modelling with conviction and élan".

The building is on the site of a Second World War V1 flying bomb attack in 1944, which resulted in 22 deaths and 144 recorded casualties.

References

External links 

 Gort Scott transforms 1960s block in London to create co-working and maker spaces

Grade II listed retail buildings
Walthamstow
Shopping centres in the London Borough of Waltham Forest
Buildings and structures completed in 1958
Grade II listed buildings in the London Borough of Waltham Forest